Malinovo is a village in Lovech Municipality, Lovech Province, northern Bulgaria.

The village of Malinovo has a  Turkish majority. It is one of the few places in the province of Lovech with a Turkish majority. There is also a large Turkish minority living in the nearby village of  Aleksandrovo.

References

Villages in Lovech Province